Associação Campo Mourão Futsal, is a Brazilian futsal club(i.e. indoor/hard floor club) from Campo Mourão founded in 2012 which plays in Liga Futsal.

Current squad

References

External links
 Campo Mourão official Facebook page
 Campo Mourão LNF profile
 Campo Mourão in zerozero.pt

Futsal clubs established in 2012
2012 establishments in Brazil
Futsal clubs in Brazil
Sports teams in Paraná